Tahirli is a village and municipality in the Jalilabad Rayon of Azerbaijan. It has a population of 367.

References

Populated places in Jalilabad District (Azerbaijan)